Niguza spiramioides is a species of moth of the family Erebidae first described by Francis Walker in 1858. It is found in Australia in the Northern Territory, Queensland and Western Australia.

References

Catocalini
Moths of Australia